Michael McIntyre is an Australian maker of documentary films. He has worked on Yogawoman, Aussie Rules the World and Kangaroo: A Love-Hate Story.

References 

Living people
Australian documentary film directors
Year of birth missing (living people)